Sirpur-Kaghaznagar is a town and a municipality in Komaram Bheem Asifabad district in the state of Telangana in India. It is located around 16 km away from Sirpur (T). The town derives its name from the paper factory established during the times of Nizams rule.

Geography
It has an average elevation of 174 meters (574 feet).

Demographics
 India census, the town of Kagaznagar had a population of 66,293, with 33,124 males, and 33,169 females. There were a total of 5,576 children between the ages of 0 and 6 and 15,712 inhabitants were classified as illiterate. The town has a unique blend of people settled from different parts of India. Apart from Telugu and Urdu and Gondi, Marathi is also widely understood due to the town's proximity to Maharashtra. Bengali language is widely spoken in Easgaon village owing to settlement of Bengali refugees. The literacy rate stood at 73.07 percent.

The city's predominant religion is Hinduism practiced by 65.85% of the population. Islam is second, with 30.85%, followed by Christianity at 1.24%, Sikhism at 0.18% and Buddhism at 1.12%.

Transport
The town is connected to AP SH 1 at Rebbena through a road. Kagaznagar is connected to many cities in Telangana by the Telangana State Road Transport Corporation bus service.

The town is served by Sirpur Kaghaznagar railway station which lies on New Delhi–Chennai main line. It is administrated by South Central Railway zone.

The nearest airport is Nagpur Airport (257 km away) and Hyderabad Airport (307 km away).

Economy
The local economy was almost completely dependent on manufacturing at Sirpur Paper Mills which has been acquired by J. K. Organisation and has been restarted in August 2018 with production likely to begin from April 2019. Sirsilk Textile Factory is closed, but Koneru Konappa, the present MLA of the area is claiming that he will reopen it. Presently the entire economy is run by agriculture allied activities and also the Real Estate is growing very fast.

Civic administration
Kagaznagar Municipality was constituted in 1956 and is classified as a third grade municipality with 30 election wards.

References

Cities and towns in Komaram Bheem district
Mandals in Komaram Bheem district